Tehran with more than 15 million people population during day time, suffers from severe massive traffic congestion in rush hours.

Tehran is a city that gets busier and busier during the day and people flock to work from nearby cities and towns. As stated in a 2018 World Bank study, rapid population growth due to continuous migration, growing industrialization and high traffic have added to the pollution problems of the Iranian capital.

Tehran is also rated as one of the most polluted cities in the globe. Parts of the city are often covered by smog especially in winter time, causing widespread pulmonary illnesses. It is estimated that about 27 people die each day from pollution-related diseases.

Tehran, the largest city in West Asia with a population of 14 million, has less than 100 sunny days a year. This is particularly problematic for the economic heart of the country. Traffic congestion, lack of rainfall aggravates this problem. However, it is believed that the bad weather is not the main reason, but only other stressors such as the population of the capital and also the number of cars are increasing at a very high speed. Another general problem in Iran is inadequate road and street infrastructure, severe lack of public transportation, and lack of effective and appropriate urban planners.

The amount and causes of pollution in Tehran 
In 2019, the average of 25.9 micro grams per cubic meter placed Tehran in the 582nd place among all the polluted cities in the world, and Iran ranked twenty-seventh among all the countries in the world. The main reason for pollution is the use of vehicles with low quality fuels. Because the fuel produced in Iran has a lower quality than many international fuels. The World Health Organization (WHO) had in 2018 put Tehran in the category of ‘most polluted cities in the world,’ while the World Bank in its 2018 report said this city accounts for 4,000 of the 12,000 deaths due to air pollution in Iran annually.

See also
Environmental issues in Tehran

References

External links
 Traffic jam in Tehran- junction Vozara and Behesti avenues.

Tehran
Air pollution by region